Louis-Marie-Athanase de Loménie, Comte de Brienne (20 April 1730 – 10 May 1794) was a French officer and politician, who was guillotined during the French Revolution.

Life

He was from the younger branch of the Lomenie Flavignac family originating in Limousin, which became in the seventeenth century the house of Brienne. Louis-Marie-Athanasius was the younger brother of Cardinal Etienne-Charles de Lomenie de Brienne, Minister of Louis XVI of France.  As Lieutenant General of the armies of the king, he commanded the Royal regiment of Artois from 1747 to 1762. Appointed Secretary of State for War from 1787 to 1788, he was guillotined on 21 Floreal Year II (10 May 1794) with four other members of his family and Élisabeth de France.

He was Marquis de Moy and lord of Vendeuil by marrying Etiennette Fizeau Clémont, who was the daughter of a wealthy mill owner in Saint-Quentin.  He rebuilt the castle in Brienne-le-Château, and bought in Paris a beautiful town house in the Rue Saint-Dominique called Hotel de Brienne, current residence of the Minister of the Army.

Athanase de Brienne and Etiennette Fizeaux had a son, François-Alexandre-Antoine Lomenie, Vicomte de Brienne, commanding officer of the 12th regiment of chasseur à cheval, who was guillotined on 21 Floreal Year II at the age of 36 years. His widow, Madame de Montbreton, died in 1851; Brienne-le-Château was then sold to the Princesse de Bauffremont.

See also
 House of Brienne

Sources
 BNF, département des Manuscrits, div. occidentale, fonds Bauffremont Fr 23350-23621.
 Brienne (Comte de ) et Loménie de Brienne (Etienne-Charles de), Journal de l'Assemblée des Notables de 1787, éd. P. Chevallier, 1960.
 Mme de Créquy, Souvenirs.
 Stanford Library, 18th Century Judicial.
 Bunel Arnaud, Héraldique Européenne, 1997–2007.
 ville-brienne-le-chateau.fr
 archives of the Fizeaux family (private foundation).

1730 births
1794 deaths
Secretaries of State for War (France)
French people executed by guillotine during the French Revolution
18th-century French politicians